Mujahid Gangal is a village in the Bassali Union Council of the Rawalpindi Tehsil in Rawalpindi District, Punjab, Pakistan. The village has a government elementary school for boys, with 126 students, and one for girls with 152 students.

References

External links 
 Google Maps Location

Villages in Rawalpindi Tehsil